The Stanford Cardinal women's lacrosse team is an NCAA Division I college lacrosse team representing Stanford University as part of the Pac-12 Conference. They play their home games at Laird Q. Cagan Stadium in Stanford, California.

Head coach

The Cardinal are led by head coach Amy Bokker. A graduate of College of William & Mary, Bokker was the head coach at American for one season before taking over at George Mason in 1998. In eleven seasons with the Patriots, Bokker compiled a record of 86-94, leading the team to a 12-5 record and a no. 16 national ranking in her final year in 2008, although the team never made the NCAA Tournament. 
Bokker came to Palo Alto in 2009, and in nine seasons, she has led the Cardinal to five conference tournament titles, two regular-season championships, and six NCAA Tournament bids. She has also coached seven All-Americans and has served as an assistant coach on the U.S. women's national team.

Individual career records

Reference:

Individual single-season records
Reference:

Seasons

Postseason Results

The Cardinal have appeared in 7 NCAA tournaments. Their postseason record is 2-7.

References

1995 establishments in California
College women's lacrosse teams in the United States
Lacrosse teams in California
Lacrosse clubs established in 1995
Stanford Cardinal
Women's sports in California